Agarak is a village in the Lori Province of Armenia.

Geography 
Agarak lies at the end of the H-33 highway. The area is dominated by agriculture.

Demographics 
The village had 1,155 inhabitants in 2011.

Gallery

References

External links 

Populated places in Lori Province